Charles McCormick may refer to:

 Charles T. McCormick (1889–1963), American university professor
 Charles Edward McCormick (1946–2022) American musician with the band Bloodstone
 Charles Perry McCormick (1896–1970), American businessman and civic leader in Baltimore, Maryland

See also
Charles J. McCormack (1865–1915), American politician in New York City 
Charlie McCormack (1895–1975), Scottish footballer